Laura Štefanac is a Croatian paralympic athlete competing in javelin throw, hammer throw, discus throw and shot put.

She was born deaf in 1998 in Croatia's capital Zagreb.

She won a gold medal at the Olympic games for deaf people in Samsun (2017.) in javelin throw, as well as 3 gold and 3 silver medals at the European junior championships in Trabzon 2014 and Karlsruhe 2016.

She is a member of AK Agram from Zagreb.

References

1998 births
Sportspeople from Zagreb
Croatian female athletes
Paralympic athletes of Croatia
Living people